Maie Ash (31 May 1888 – 13 December 1923) was a British musical comedy actress and dancer.

Biography
She was born Eleanor Mabel Eugene Ash in Clapton, London on 31 May 1888.  Her father was James T. W. Ash, an accountant.

Ash made her first London appearance in 1902 at the Shaftesbury Theatre in A Little Un-fairy Princess before moving into the title role of Cinderella the following year at Southampton.  In 1904 she played Margo in Goody Two Shoes at Liverpool and understudied the role of Pansy at the Vaudeville Theatre in London.  Other musical comedies include Yellow Fog Island at Terry's Theatre and My Darling at the Hicks Theatre in 1907.

She married actor Stanley Brett, the brother of Seymour Hicks in 1909.  They divorced in 1913 and Ash married comedian Fred Allandale in 1915.

She died on 13 December 1923 in Brighton, aged 35. She is buried in Abney Park Cemetery.

References

1888 births
1923 deaths
Burials at Abney Park Cemetery
English stage actresses
20th-century English actresses